Innocent Achanya Otobo Ujah (born 6 November 1954) is a Nigerian Professor of Obstetrics and Gynaecology, the current Vice-Chancellor of the Federal University of Medical Science, Otukpo, Benue State and the president of the Nigerian Medical Association (NMA).

Biography 
Ujah was born on 6 November 1954 and hails from Aidogodo-Okpoga, Okpokwu, Benue State. He studied medicine at Ahmadu Bello University (ABU), Zaria and graduated in June 1978. He started working as a lecturer and consultant at University of Jos and Jos University Teaching Hospital in 1988. He became a professor in 2001.

Ujah was appointed as the director general of the Nigerian Institute of Medical Research (NIMR) by Dr. Goodluck Jonathan in April 2010 and was disengaged on 27 July 2016 for corruption charges. He was appointed as the pioneer Vice-Chancellor of the Federal University of Medical Science, Otukpo by Muhammadu Buhari on 12 May 2020. He was elected as the President of the Nigerian Medical Association (NMA) in a virtual election on 30 May 2020, succeeding Francis Faduyile. Concerns were raised surrounding Ujah's emergence as the NMA president as he is a government appointee and his conflict of interest might weaken the position of the NMA.

He was investigated for some irregularities during his leadership at NIMR. 

He is a member of Society of Gynecology and Obstetrics of Nigeria (SOGON).

References 

Nigerian obstetricians
Nigerian gynaecologists
Ahmadu Bello University alumni
Vice-Chancellors of Nigerian universities
Living people
1954 births
People from Benue State